Fac Not Fiction is the second studio album by American rap group 187 Fac, released August 26, 1997 on Penalty Recordings. It was produced by Ant Banks, Clint "Payback" Sands, Ephriam Galloway, Ivan Johnson, Mike Mosely and Spice 1. The album peaked at number 81 on the Billboard Top R&B/Hip-Hop Albums chart. It features guest performances by Spice 1, Ant Banks, B-Legit, V-Dal, Big Lurch, Captain Save 'Em and the former member of the group Frank J.

Track listing

Chart history

References

External links 
[ Fac Not Fiction] at Allmusic
Fac Not Fiction at Discogs
Fac Not Fiction at MusicBrainz
Fac Not Fiction at Tower Records

1997 albums
Albums produced by Ant Banks
West Coast hip hop albums
187 Fac albums